Methylenetetrahydrofolate dehydrogenase 1 deficiency (MTHFD1 deficiency) is a disease resulting from mutations of the MTHFD1 gene. Patients with this disease may have hemolytic uremic syndrome, macrocytosis, epilepsy, hearing loss, retinopathy, mild mental retardation, lymphocytopenia (involving all subsets) and low T-cell receptor excision circles.

History 

The disease was first described by Watkins et al. in 2011.

Alternative names 
 Combined immunodeficiency and megaloblastic anemia with or without hyperhomocysteinemia (CIMAH)

External links
 Combined immunodeficiency and megaloblastic anemia with or without hyperhomocysteinemia (CIMAH) - a record in OMIM

References

Genetic diseases and disorders
Enzyme defects